Martin Otto Harwit (born 9 March 1931) is a Czech-American astronomer and author known for his scientific work on infrared astronomy as a professor at Cornell University. He was later director of the National Air and Space Museum in Washington, D.C. from 1987 to 1995.

Career
He attended Oberlin College for his B.A. in physics, and earned a master’s degree from the University of Michigan after which he was awarded a Ph.D in physics by Massachusetts Institute of Technology in 1960. That same year he was granted a NATO postdoctoral fellowship at Cambridge University, followed in 1961 by a (US) National Science Foundation postdoctoral fellowship at Cornell University, Ithaca, New York, 

In 1962 he joined the astronomy faculty at Cornell and was later appointed professor. His main interest lay in the building of telescopes to observe infrared radiation from space, which required the telescopes to be launched into orbit. He designed, built and launched the first rocket-powered liquid-helium-cooled telescopes in the late 1960s and also carried out astronomical observations from high-altitude NASA aircraft. In 1987 he was elected a Fellow of the American Physical Society "in recognition of twenty-five years of outstanding contributions to theoretical and observational infrared astrophysics and for providing the leadership needed to create a coordinated space astrophysics program for the remainder of the century through the Great Observatory Program"

In 1987, he moved from Cornell to be director of the National Air and Space Museum in Washington, DC, where he organised the production of three wide-screen IMAX films, Blue Planet (1990), dealing with Earth, Destiny in Space, dealing with space exploration, and Cosmic Voyage, dealing with cosmic space and time. The latter film, released in 1996, was nominated for a 1997 Academy Award for best documentary.

Enola Gay controversy
The museum was also involved in the restoration of historic aircraft, including the "Enola Gay", which had dropped an atomic bomb in 1945 on the Japanese town of Hiroshima. In 1994 Harwit became embroiled in public debate when his preparations for an Enola Gay exhibition to mark the 50th anniversary of the event were accused of being "revisionist history" for including Japanese accounts of the attack and photographs of the victims. His critics alleged that the exhibition commentary "depicted the Japanese as victims of a United States motivated by vengeance." 
Two of the lines about the war in the Pacific became infamous:  The immediately preceding two sentences did acknowledge that  Those lines, in turn, were immediately preceded by 
The controversy led Harwit to resign as director of the National Air and Space Museum in May 1995.

Honors
1987: Fellowship of American Physical Society
Asteroid 12143 Harwit named after him.

Works 
 
 Astrophysical Concepts (1st edition 1973, 4th edition 2006) ; 
 Cosmic Discovery: The Search, Scope and Heritage of Astronomy (1981) 
 
 An Exhibit Denied: Lobbying the History of Enola Gay (1996)

References

External links 
 Oral History interview transcript with Martin Harwit 19 April 1983, American Institute of Physics, Niels Bohr Library and Archives

1931 births
Living people
American astronomers
Czech astronomers
University of Michigan alumni
MIT Department of Physics alumni
Cornell University faculty
Directors of museums in the United States
Fellows of the American Physical Society